is a Japanese television drama series that first aired on TBS in 1993.

Cast
 Kaoru Kobayashi
 Yoko Shimada
 Michitaka Tsutsui
 Riona Hazuki
 Atsuko Takahata

References

1993 in Japanese television
1993 Japanese television series debuts
1993 Japanese television series endings
Japanese drama television series
1990s Japanese television series
Nichiyō Gekijō